RFA Fort Dunvegan (A160) was a stores issuing ship of the Royal Fleet Auxiliary.

References

Stores ships of the Royal Fleet Auxiliary
1944 ships